On May 26, 1989, about 5:25 p.m. Eastern Daylight Time, a  section of the  Harrison Road (US 52) temporary bridge over the Great Miami River in Miamitown, Ohio fell about  into the rain-swollen river when a pile bent collapsed due to damage from floating debris.

Several witnesses reported a car and a pickup truck fell into the river, however only the two occupants of the car were recovered, no other vehicles were found and no other persons were ever reported missing.

The National Transportation Safety Board determined that the probable cause of the temporary bridge collapse was the selection by the Hamilton County Engineer's Office of a design by the National Engineering and Contracting Company that did not consider lateral loads and the failure of the Hamilton County Engineer's Office to promptly close the bridge when it became subject to significant debris loading. Contributing to the cause of the collapse was the failure of the Hamilton County Engineer's Office to submit the bridge design plans to the Ohio Department of Transportation for review as required by state law.

References

Bridge disasters in the United States
Bridge disasters caused by engineering error
Transport disasters in 1989
1989 disasters in the United States
Road bridges in Ohio
1989 in Ohio
Transportation disasters in Ohio
U.S. Route 52